The Dublin-class ships of the line were a class of seven 74-gun third rates, designed for the Royal Navy by Sir Thomas Slade.

Design
The Dublin-class ships were the first 74-gun ships to be designed for the Royal Navy, and marked the beginning of a more dynamic era of naval design than that in the ultra-conservative Establishment era preceding it.

Slade's draught was approved on 26 August 1755 when the first two orders were transmitted to Deptford Dockyard. The design was some 4½ feet longer than the preceding 70-gun ships of the 1745 Establishment, with the extra length making provision for an additional (14th) pair of 32-pounder guns on the lower deck compared with the 13 pairs of the 70-gun ships. They were nominally ordered as 70-gun ships (although always designed to carry 74), but redesignated as 74-gun during construction.

Ships

Builder: Deptford Dockyard
Ordered: 26 August 1755
Laid down: 18 November 1755
Launched: 6 May 1757
Completed: 1 July 1757
Fate: Broken up, May 1784

Builder: Deptford Dockyard
Ordered: 26 August 1755
Laid down: 18 November 1755
Launched: 28 December 1757
Completed: 23 February 1758
Fate: Broken up, December 1774

Builder: Wells & Company, Deptford
Ordered: 28 October 1755
Laid down: 14 January 1756
Launched: 23 February 1758
Completed: 2 May 1758 at Deptford Dockyard
Fate: Condemned and scuttled at Jamaica 12 June 1783

Builder: Chatham Dockyard
Ordered: 28 October 1755
Laid down: 8 April 1756
Launched: 25 February 1758
Completed: 26 May 1758
Fate: Sunk as breakwater, 1784; later raised and broken up May 1789

Builder: Woolwich Dockyard
Ordered: 28 October 1755
Laid down: 1 May 1756
Launched: 15 March 1759
Completed: 12 April 1759
Fate: Sold to be broken up, August 1784

Builder: Thomas West, Deptford
Ordered: 14 November 1755
Laid down: November 1755
Launched: 8 April 1758
Completed: 27 July 1758 at Deptford Dockyard
Fate: Broken up, November 1801

Builder: Henry Bird, Northam, Southampton
Ordered: 24 November 1755
Laid down: December 1755
Launched: 14 December 1758
Completed: 23 March 1759 at Portsmouth Dockyard
Fate: Wrecked, 20 November 1759 during Battle of Quiberon

References

Lavery, Brian (2003) The Ship of the Line – Volume 1: The development of the battlefleet 1650–1850. Conway Maritime Press. .
Lyon, David (1993) The Sailing Navy List. Conway Maritime Press. 
Winfield, Rif (2007) British Warships in the Age of Sail: 1714 – 1792. Seaforth Publishing. 

 
Ship of the line classes